The  was based on an already existing reinforced Type 97 Chi-Ha medium tank chassis developed by the Imperial Japanese Army in World War II.

Development
Inspired by the Grille series of self-propelled artillery vehicles developed by Nazi Germany during World War II, wherein a 15 cm sIG 33 infantry support gun was mounted on a tracked chassis, engineers at the Army Technical Bureau resolved to do the same. Just like the German Grille, the Ho-Ro was based on an already existing chassis. Production was assigned to Mitsubishi Heavy Industries. The exact number produced is uncertain, but 12 units were built in 1944.

Design

The chassis selected was a modified Type 97 Chi-Ha medium tank chassis. On to this platform, a Type 38 150 mm howitzer based on a design by the German arms-manufacturer Krupp was mounted, but dated from 1905 and had been withdrawn from service as being obsolete in 1942. The main gun could fire Type 88 APHE rounds and HEAT rounds, if necessary. Given its breech loader, the maximum rate of fire was only 5 rounds per minute. The gun's elevation was restricted to 30 degrees by the construction of the chassis. The restricted elevation meant it was capable of firing a 35 kilogram shell 6,000 meters (6,600 yards). Other design issues included the fact that although the gun crew was protected by a gun shield with armor thickness of 25 mm at the front, the shield with armor thickness of 12 mm only extended a very short distance on the sides; leaving the rest of the sides and back exposed. In addition, the Ho-Ro did not have any secondary armament, such as a machine-gun, making it vulnerable to close combat.

Combat history
The Type 4 Ho-Ro was rushed into service, deployed and saw combat as part of the 2nd Tank Division with the Japanese Fourteenth Area Army during the Philippines Campaign in the last year of World War II. Remaining units were deployed to Okinawa in ones and twos for island defense during the Battle of Okinawa, but were severely outnumbered by American artillery.

Surviving example 

The only known surviving example of a Type 4 Ho-Ro is located at the American Heritage Museum in Stow, Massachusetts. It is currently on loan from the National Museum of the Marine Corps and was captured on the island of Luzon in the Philippines.

Notes

References

External links
Taki's Imperial Japanese Army Page - Akira Takizawa
Catalog of Enemy Ordnance

World War II self-propelled artillery
150 mm artillery
World War II armoured fighting vehicles of Japan
Mitsubishi
Military vehicles introduced from 1940 to 1944